Patrick Darren Deuel (March 28, 1962 – April 29, 2016) was an American individual known for being one of the heaviest people in the world. He was the subject of the documentary "Half Ton Man" in Channel 4's BodyShock series.

Early life 
Patrick Deuel was born on March 28, 1962, in Grand Island, Nebraska the child of James W. Deuel and Betty Jean Otte. Deuel was a Boy Scout and in 1976 received the Eagle Scout Award with three Eagle palms. He graduated in 1980 from Grand Island High School, having previously attended Trinity Lutheran School and Walnut Junior High.

After graduating high school, Deuel studied at Hastings College for one semester. After this, he went to the University of Nebraska–Lincoln. He became a restaurant manager.

Obesity 
At one point, Deuel had not left his house (in Valentine) for five years. He was so large that half the house had to be cut out to extract him from his home. He was rushed to a hospital at Sioux Falls, South Dakota in an ambulance with extra-wide doors and a ramp-and-winch system that had to be dispatched from Denver. Despite being  morbidly obese, Deuel was also malnourished because many of the calories he had consumed were from junk food.

Death 

Deuel died at his home on April 29, 2016.

See also
 List of heaviest people
 Obesity

References

External links

1962 births
2016 deaths
People from Grand Island, Nebraska
People from Kearney, Nebraska
People from Valentine, Nebraska